Alicia Michelle Reece (born April 25, 1971) is a Democratic politician currently serving as a Hamilton County Commissioner. She formerly served as a member of the Ohio House of Representatives for the 33rd district. She was previously the Vice Mayor of Cincinnati from 2002 to 2007.

Life and career
Reece is a graduate of Withrow High School International Studies Academy  and Grambling State University. Before becoming a state legislator she was on the city council of Cincinnati and was the city's deputy mayor.

Ohio House of Representatives
She was appointed to the House of Representatives in 2010, replacing Tyrone Yates who became a judge. She was reelected in 2010 with 69.2% of the vote. She served on the committees of Economic and Small Business Development; Finance and Appropriations; and Local Government.

In October 2011 Reece was named as the vice-chair of the Ohio Women’s Democratic Caucus.

Reece won a second term in 2012 with 73.29% of the vote over Tom Bryan.

References

Electoral history

External links

 Archived version (March 2018) of Reece's website as Ohio Representative

Democratic Party members of the Ohio House of Representatives
1971 births
Living people
Women state legislators in Ohio
Grambling State University alumni
African-American state legislators in Ohio
African-American women in politics
21st-century American politicians
21st-century American women politicians
21st-century African-American women
21st-century African-American politicians
20th-century African-American people
20th-century African-American women